The Ideal City is a 2012 Italian thriller drama film, written and directed by Luigi Lo Cascio. It is Cascio's directorial debut film. The film premiered in International Film Critics' Week section at 69th Venice International Film Festival on August 11, 2012.

The film screened at number of film festivals before having a theatrical release in Italy on April 11, 2013.

Plot
The film tells the story of the architect and ecologist Michele Grassadonia, who moves from his hometown of Palermo to live in Siena and build a life that is as environmentally friendly as possible.

Cast
Luigi Lo Cascio as Michele Grassadonia
Catrinel Menghia as Alexandra
Luigi Maria Burruano as Avv. Scalici
Aida Burruano as Madre
Barbara Enrichi as Giudice
Massimo Foschi	as Avv. Chiantini
Roberto Herlitzka as Custode Maneggio
Alfonso Santagata as Pubblico Ministero
Manuel Zicarelli as Marco

Reception
The film received mixed to positive reviews from the critics. Boyd van Hoeij in his review for Variety said that "An ecologically minded Italo engineer finds himself in judicial quicksand after he pulls over his borrowed car to help someone lying in the road, in this intriguing, only lightly absurdist drama." Jennie Kermode of Eye for Film gave the film four out of five stars and called it "An intriguing piece of work and particularly impressive for a début feature, this won't be everybody's ideal film but some viewers will adore it." Mymovies.it said that "The ideal city remains an important debut and mature in the spread of so much ugliness takes the side of beauty."

Accolades

References

External links
 

2012 films
2010s Italian-language films
2012 thriller drama films
Italian thriller drama films
Films set in Tuscany
2012 directorial debut films
2012 drama films